Shakespeare Quarterly is a peer-reviewed academic journal established in 1950 by the Shakespeare Association of America. It is now under the auspices of the Folger Shakespeare Library. Along with book and performance criticism, Shakespeare Quarterly incorporates scholarly research and essays on Shakespeare and the age in which he worked, particularly those that explore new perspectives. It includes a special section devoted to the latest ideas in Shakespeare scholarship.

As a companion, the Folger Library also publishes the reference database World Shakespeare Bibliography Online, which contains more than 125,000 annotated bibliographical references and several hundred thousand reviews.

The editor of Shakespeare Quarterly is Jeremy Lopez (Montclair State University). The World Shakespeare Bibliography is edited by Dr. Heidi Craig (Texas A&M University).

See also 
 Folger Shakespeare Library
 Shakespeare's plays
 English Renaissance theatre
 Shakespeare on screen

External links 

 Folger Shakespeare Library.
 World Shakespeare Bibliography Online
 Shakespeare Quarterly at Project MUSE

Literary magazines published in the United States
Shakespearean scholarship
Quarterly journals
Johns Hopkins University Press academic journals
Publications established in 1950
English-language journals
Shakespeare
1950 establishments in the United States
Folger Shakespeare Library